The  Photron FASTCAM Ultima 40K  is a 256 x 256 High-speed camera.  It is part of the Photron FASTCAM line of cameras, introduced in 1996.
Photron FASTCAM Ultima 40K was introduce in 2000.  However, the camera was trade branded previously in 1992 as a KODAK MASD product.   The Kodak HS4540 and the Photron Ultima 40K are the same camera, just different trade names.

Overview and features
The FASTCAM Ultima 40K native resolution is 256 x 256 pixels x 8 bits at 4,500 FPS.  By reducing the resolution, the frame rate for recording can be increased.  As an example, 40,500 FPS is achieved with a resolution of 64 x 64 pixels at 8 bits.   The FASTCAM Ultima 40K processor came with three memory configurations that allowed full frame storage of 8192 images (512 MB), 16,384 images (1GB) or 24,576 images (1.5 GB).   At 4,500 fps and maximum memory, the recording time is 5.46 seconds.  The Ultima 40K image sensor reads images in blocks which is commonly called a Block Readout sensor.   The image sensor is divided into 16 blocks where each block is 256 x 16 pixels.  And within one block, one half to one fourth of the block can be partially read out.   Digital image data could be read from the Processor through a SCSI interface.  Live video images could be displayed on NTSC or PAL monitors.  Ancillary information would be display as OSD (On-Screen-Data).  The camera cable could be up to 15m from the Processor.  The system could be controlled from a computer through an RS-232 interface sending simple ASCII commands.

The FASTCAM Ultima 10K  has been used in ballistic studies, airbag design and qualification studies, combustion studies, flow visualization studies such as aerosol dispersion and many other high-speed camera applications.  Photron manufactured various version of this high-speed camera system ( Photron Rabbit,  Kodak HS4540, Photron Ultima 40K and the Photron FASTCAM SE all using the same image sensor) from 1990 to 2006.

Kodak MASD manufactured a similar high speed camera before the Photron Rabbit called the Kodak SP2000.  This camera also used a Block Readout sensor with 240 x 192 pixels 8 bits at 12,000 fps.  The SP2000 was first introduced in 1981, a full decade ahead in performance over  any other high speed camera .

See also 
 Photron (Photron's FASTCAM High-speed Cameras)
 High-speed photography
 High-speed camera

References

External links
 Official website (Photron)
  (FASTCAM Ultima 40K)
  (Rolling vs. Global Shutter)
    (Electronic Imaging)
  (US 4322638 A - Image sensor adaptable for fast frame readout)

High-speed cameras
Digital movie cameras